Climbing is the activity of using one's hands, feet, or other parts of the body to ascend a steep topographical object that can range from the world's tallest mountains (e.g. the eight thousanders) to small boulders.  Climbing is done for locomotion, for sporting recreation, for competition, and is also done in trades that rely on ascension; such as rescue and military operations.  Climbing is done indoors and outdoors, on natural surfaces (e.g. rock climbing and ice climbing), and on artificial surfaces (e.g. climbing walls).   

Professional mountain guides or rock climbing guides (e.g. the UIAGM), were a significant element in developing the popularity of the sport in the natural environment, and remain so today.  Since the 1980s, the development of competition climbing and the availability of artificial climbing walls have dramatically increased the popularity of rock climbing as a sport, and led to the emergence of professional rock climbers, such as Wolfgang Güllich, Chris Sharma, Adam Ondra, Lynn Hill, Catherine Destivelle, and Janja Garnbret.

Climbing became an Olympic sport for the first time in the 2021 Olympic Games in Tokyo (see Sport climbing at the 2020 Summer Olympics) for sport climbing and speed climbing disciplines.

Rock-based

Rock climbing can trace its origins to the late 19th-century, and has since developed into a number of main sub-disciplines (single-pitch, multi-pitch/big wall, bouldering, and competition), which in themselves can be conducted in varying manners (aid, sport, traditional and free solo):

 Single pitch climbing means ascending climbs that are a single rope-length (up to 50-metres) while big wall climbing (and multi-pitch climbing) means ascending routes that are many rope-lengths (can be up to 1,000-metres).  These two rock climbing sub-disciplines can be conducted in one of a number of ways: 
 Aid climbing is a form of rock climbing that uses artificial aids such as ladders, pitons, and other mechanical devices to assist in ascending a route.  Much of rock climbing began as aid climbing, and even up until the 1970s, many big wall route required aid climbing techniques.
 Sport climbing is a form of rock climbing that uses no artificial aids (which is known as free climbing), but does rely on permanent fixed bolts (or other mechanical anchors), for use as protection while climbing (but not as aid); was started in the 1980s in France.
 Traditional climbing is a form of rock climbing that uses no artificial aids (and is thus free climbing) but unlike sport climbing, the climbers place removable protection such as camming devices and nuts, while ascending the route, which is then removed by the second climber. 
 Free soloing is a form of rock climbing that uses no artificial aids (and is thus free climbing) and where the climber uses no protection (neither sport nor traditional); thus any fall while free soloing could be fatal; deep-water soloing is a form of free soloing where a fall will result in landing into safe water.
 Top rope climbing is a form of rock climbing that uses no artificial aids but as the sole form of protection, uses a pre-fixed rope secured to the top of the route (i.e. is used on single-pitches), and thus should the climber fall, they simply hang off the rope with no risk of any injury; it is not regarded as free climbing.
 Bouldering: means ascending boulders or small outcrops with no artificial aids (it is free climbing) and due to the lower height, with no protection (i.e. bouldering is a form of free soloing); very tall boulders where a fall could be serious (i.e. up to 10-metres) are known as highball bouldering.
 Competition climbing: A formal, competitive sport of recent origins from the 1980s, normally practiced as indoor climbing on artificial climbing walls that resemble natural formations. The International Federation of Sport Climbing (IFSC) is the official governing body for competition rock climbing worldwide and is recognized by the IOC and GAISF and is a member of the International World Games Association (IWGA). The UIAA is the official governing body for competition ice climbing worldwide. Competition rock climbing has three major disciplines: Lead climbing (performed as sport climbing), Bouldering, and Speed climbing (performed as top roping)

Other mountain-based

 Ice climbing: Ascending ice or hard snow using equipment such as ice axes and crampons, but also equipment from rock climbing such as ropes.
 Mixed climbing: Ascending routes that required a combination of ice climbing and rock climbing skills (often known as Alpine climbing).
 Mountaineering: Ascending mountains for sport or recreation, which can often involve rock or ice climbing (e.g. Alpine or Himalayan climbing).
 Scrambling: Climbing rocky faces and ridges, which can include basic rock climbing, but is considered part of hillwalking.
 Solo climbing: Ascending routes alone; can involve ropes (roped solo climbing) and artificial aid; where no protection or aid is used, it is free soloing.

Other recreational-based

 Buildering: Ascending the exterior skeletons of buildings, typically without protective equipment (e.g. as free solo climbing by Alain Robert).
 Canyoneering: Climbing along canyons for sport or recreation.
 Crane climbing: An illicit act of climbing up mechanical cranes, which is a form of buildering.
 Grass climbing: An older form of climbing when climbing steep but grassy mountainsides, often requiring ropes, was undertaken.
 Mallakhamba: A traditional Indian sport that combines climbing a pole or rope with the performance of aerial yoga and gymnastics.
 Parkour: A sport based around smooth movement, including climbing, around urban landscapes.
 Pole climbing: Climbing poles and masts without equipment.
 Rope climbing: Climbing a short, thick rope for speed; not to be confused with roped climbing, as used in rock or ice climbing.
 Stair climbing: ascending elevation via stairs.  
 Tree climbing: Recreationally ascending trees using ropes and other protective equipment.

Commercial-based

 Rope access: Industrial climbing, usually abseiling, as an alternative to scaffolding for short works on exposed structures.
 A tower climber is a professional who climbs broadcasting or telecommunication towers or masts for maintenance or repair.

In film

Climbing has been the subject of both film and documentary film with notable examples being Touching the Void, Everest, Cliffhanger and Free Solo.

In popular culture
At several locations there is climbing as part of a ritual performed. These are among others:
 Oeli, Zurich, Switzerland: a taverne where a drinking game is made where one has to climb up to a beam at the ceiling and move to another beam and then to drink a glass of wine with the head hanging down 
 Gänseliesel, Göttingen, Germany: it is a tradition, that students climb up the statue of this fountain and kiss it after immatriculation .
 Herndon Monument, Annapolis, United States: there is a tradition that the students, which finished their first study year at United States Naval Academy, replace a sailor cap on the top of Herndon Monument by a peaked cap.
 Street Parade, Zurich, Switzerland: on this event it is not incommon to climb on traffic light poles and other objects.

Gallery

See also 

 Climbing clubs
 Climbing equipment
 Climbing organizations
 List of climbers
 List of climbing topics
 Glossary of climbing terms

References

External links 
Rock climbing: from ancient practice to Olympic sport, Freddie Wilkinson, (National Geographic, March 2019)
Rock climbing - history & factfile, BBC (2022)